A relaxer is a type of lotion or cream that makes hair easier to straighten

Relaxer may also refer to:

 Relaxer (album), a 2017 studio album by Alt-J
 Relaxer (film), a 2018 film directed by Joel Potrykus
 Muscle relaxer, a drug that affects skeletal muscle function and decreases the muscle tone.

See also 
 Relax (disambiguation)
 Junior Relaxer, album by King Cobb Steele